Harold Carl Otto Loesch (October 3, 1926 – May 12, 2011) was a marine biologist and oceanographer who is credited with being the first to examine the Mobile Bay jubilee in an  paper

Much of his career was as an academic holding a professorship in the Department of Marine Sciences at Louisiana State University, though he also spent many years working for the United Nations agencies UNESCO and FAO to develop  fisheries in newly industrialized countries.  His principal areas of research were shrimp, copepods, and commercial fisheries development.

Academic career 
Loesch received his Ph.D. in biological oceanography from Texas A&M University in 1962.  He served as a professor at Louisiana State University in Baton Rouge, Louisiana in the Department of Zoology and Physiology in 1968 and 1969, and then as a Professor of Marine Sciences from 1969 to 1975.  During this time he studied shrimp fisheries in nearby Barataria Bay in association with the National Science Foundation Sea Grant Development Office.

He also held the titles of visiting professor in both the Organization of American States Marine Sciences Program in Guayaquil, Ecuador, and at The School for Field Studies Marine Ecology program at South Caicos Island in the British West Indies.

Work with UNESCO and FAO 
From 1960 to 1968 Loesch worked as a shrimp biologist and fisheries officer for the Food and Agriculture Organization of the United Nations in Guatemala City, Guatemala, Guayaquil, Ecuador and Tegucigalpa, and La Ceiba, Honduras.

After teaching at Louisiana State University, he returned to the service of the United Nations, this time with the United Nations Educational, Scientific and Cultural Organization (UNESCO).  He served as lead biologist for the United Nations Development Programme at Monterrey Institute of Technology and Higher Education and at the National Autonomous University of Mexico Marine Station in Ciudad del Carmen, Mexico from 1976 to 1980.

He served once again with FAO as a project manager for a fishery development project in Dhaka, Bangladesh from 1981 to 1986.

Loesch died in May 2011 in Pensacola, Florida, leaving behind five children, seven grandchildren, and five great-grandchildren.

Publications

References 

1926 births
2011 deaths
People from McGregor, Texas
Louisiana State University faculty
American marine biologists
Texas A&M University faculty